Jarred Jermaine Gazarian (born March 23, 1987), professionally known as J Maine, is an American record producer from San Francisco, California, now based in Los Angeles, California. J Maine is known for coining RnBass, a West Coast-originated music genre popularized across the United States by producer DJ Mustard.

Early life
J Maine was born on March 23, 1987, in San Francisco, California. His mother is of German and Armenian descent, and his father is of African-American descent. From 2005 to 2006, he interned at 106 KMEL during the hyphy movement, and went on to becoming intern of the year. While working at a T-Mobile and living in the Bay Area, J Maine was persuaded by his friend, Tarik Bourdoud, to pursue a professional music career in Los Angeles. J Maine familiarized himself with the LA music scene by working at Power 106, where he was eventually fired from. As he continued to develop his production sound, J Maine began to utilize social media, to network with bigger producers and promote RnBass artists.

Professional career
In an interview with Vibe, J Maine described the RnBass genre stating, "RnBass is the future. I want to change the future, let's change the world." J Maine is currently active in North Hollywood, where he continues to promote new RnBass and Hip Hop musicians, interview renowned producers and songwriters, as well as produce for established and up and coming artists. In 2017, J Maine produced Omarion's single "BDY On Me". He is also a popular content creator on TikTok, where he has amassed 4.4 million followers by just pointing at the top of the screen while music plays.

Production discography

References

Record producers from California
Living people
1987 births
People of African-American descent
21st-century African-American people
21st-century African-American musicians
American people of Armenian descent
American people of German descent